Abu al-Qasim Ammar ibn Ali al-Mawsili was an important eleventh-century Arab Muslim ophthalmologist. Despite little being known about his life or education, he has been described as the most original of all Arab oculists.
 
As his nisba indicates, Ammar was born in Mosul, and later moved to Egypt, where he settled during the reign of the Fatimid caliph al-Hakim bi-Amr Allah, to whom he wrote his only composition, Kitāb al-muntakhab fī ilm al-ayn (“The book of choice in ophthalmology”).

He is mostly known for the invention of a hypodermic syringe, which he used to remove cataracts, a major cause of blindness.

Regarding his invention he wrote the following:

He was a contemporary of the famous oculist Ali ibn Isa.

See also
Ophthalmology in medieval Islam

References

11th-century people from the Fatimid Caliphate
Physicians from the Fatimid Caliphate
Opticians of the medieval Islamic world
Inventors of the medieval Islamic world
People from Mosul
11th-century Arabs